The Australian Alps is a mountain range in southeast Australia. It comprises an interim Australian bioregion, and is the highest mountain range in Australia. The range straddles the borders of eastern Victoria, southeastern New South Wales, and the Australian Capital Territory. It contains Australia's only peaks exceeding  in elevation, and is the only bioregion on the Australian mainland in which deep snow falls annually.

This chain of highlands divides the drainage of the rivers that flow to the east into the Pacific Ocean from those that flow west into the drainage of the Murray–Darling Basin (and thence to the Southern Ocean) or into inland waters, such as Lake Eyre, which lie below sea level, or else evaporate rapidly.

The Australian Alps consists of two biogeographic sub regions: the Snowy Mountains, including the Brindabella Range, located in New South Wales and the Australian Capital Territory; and the Victorian Alps, located in Victoria. The latter region is also known as the "High Country", particularly within a cultural or historical context.

Geology
Unlike the high mountain ranges found in places like the Rockies (highest peak ), the European Alps (highest peak ) or the Himalayas (highest peak ), the Australian Alps was not formed by two continental plates colliding and pushing up the Earth's rocky mantle to form jagged, rocky peaks. Instead, the Australian Alps consists of a high plateau, with significantly softer rolling hills spread across a long, wide plateau that was lifted thousands of feet up by the movement of magma when Gondwana began to break up between 130 and 160 million years ago. The highest peak in the Australian Alps is Mount Kosciuszko.

Formation of the Australian Alps was largely complete by around 100 million years ago, but during the past 90 million years, a number of minor uplift episodes have occurred, with occasional eruptions of basalt lava from small volcanoes, which has flowed across the landscape and down some of the valleys, filling in the low-lying areas to form the flat landscapes of these high plains.

During the Pleistocene ice age, commencing around 2 million years ago, when ice caps formed on many high ranges around the world, as well as at the poles, small glaciers were formed on the very highest parts of the Australian Alps, mostly in the vicinity of Mount Kosciuszko. Whilst no glaciers remain today, evidence of their past presence can be found in the numerous tarns and cirques found in that region, such as Club Lake, Blue Lake, and Hedley Tarn.

Ecology

The Australian Alps are important for conservation, recreation, and as a water drainage basin, with much of the range's eastern slopes having its runoff diverted artificially into the Murray River and its tributary the Murrumbidgee River through the civil engineering project of the Snowy Mountains Scheme.

The range's natural ecology is protected by large national parks, in particular the Kosciuszko National Park in New South Wales and the adjoining Alpine National Park in Victoria. These are managed cooperatively as the Australian Alps National Parks by agencies of the Australian government and the state governments of this region.

The Australian Alps also contains the only skiing areas of mainland Australia. Along with the town of Cabramurra, New South Wales, these are practically the only permanent settlements in the area. Several medium-sized towns can be found in the valleys below the foothills, such as Jindabyne, New South Wales, Corryong, Victoria,  and Mount Beauty.

The Australian Alps are not as high or as steep as the European Alps, New Zealand's Southern Alps, or the Andes Mountains, and most of its peaks can be reached without using mountaineering equipment.

Wildlife 
Within the Australian Alps there live hundreds of species of birds, reptiles, amphibians, and fish. Of these hundreds of various wildlife, there are approximately 40 native mammals, 200 bird species, 30 reptile species, 15 amphibians, 14 native fish species, and a wide variety of invertebrates. Additionally, many non-native species have been introduced to the Alps, creatures such as the European Rabbit, House Mouse, the Red Fox, all alongside various other species of wildlife, including dogs, cats, horses, pigs. These are all examples of foreign wildlife that have been introduced within the Australian Alps and recognise it as their habitat.  

Among this wide variety of different species of wildlife, there are different habitat requirements for each of the mentioned species, regardless of whether it is native or introduced. In addition to rock outcrops and decaying logs, there is often vegetation that provides food and shelter or a combination of these factors. Consequently, topography, soil type, and temperature determine the type of vegetation in an area and how animal populations are distributed.

Birds
The Australian Alps has been classified by BirdLife International as an Important Bird Area.  The range's montane forests and woodlands support large breeding populations of flame robins and pilotbirds.

Insects 
The bogong moth seasonally migrates long distances towards and from the Australian Alps and gregariously aestivates in caves and other sites throughout the mountain range during the summer to avoid high temperatures and lack of larval food resources. The moth is a food source for many species living within the region, such as the endangered mountain pygmy possum. However, the moth has also been a biovector of arsenic, transporting it from lowland feeding sites over long distances into the mountains, leading to the bioaccumulation of the element in the environment and animals in the mountain range.

Bushfires
Due to its mostly hot, dry climate, bushfires in Australia occur frequently, particularly in the well-forested areas of the Australian Alps. The Alps, particularly on the Victorian side of the border (known as the Victorian Alps), are periodically subject to major bushfires and have been almost entirely burnt through by bushfires on various occasions, notably; Black Thursday in 1851, Black Friday (1939), and during fires in 2003 and 2006-07.

Certain native flora in Australia have evolved to rely on bushfires as a means of reproduction, and fire events are an interwoven and an essential part of the ecology of the continent.  In some eucalypt and banksia species, for example, fire causes seed pods to open, allowing them to germinate. Fire also encourages the growth of new grassland plants.  Other species have adapted to recover quickly from fire.

Nevertheless, damage to surrounding human habitations and native fauna can be extensive and occasionally catastrophic. The 2003 Canberra bushfires severely affected almost 70% of the Australian Capital Territory's pasture, forests (pine plantations), and nature parks. After burning for a week through the Brindabella Ranges above Canberra, the fires entered the suburbs of the city on 18 January 2003. Four people died and more than 500 homes were destroyed or severely damaged. The Victorian Black Saturday bushfires were particularly intense in parts of the Victorian High Country and destroyed several towns, including Kinglake and Marysville. The fires killed 173 people, Australia's highest-ever loss of life from a bushfire. Statewide, the fires burned out over 400,000 hectares and destroyed 2,029 properties.

Alpine huts
Within the Australian Alps, the roughly 120 active alpine huts mostly date back to the early cattlemen's days, early skiing huts, and early research and surveying huts. Many of these have remained in use by fly fishers (seasonal), hikers, and skiing groups throughout the year. Most of these huts are maintained by volunteers through the Kosciuszko Huts Association and the local National Parks and Wildlife Service.

Some of the more noteworthy huts include Moscow Villa Hut, Valentine Hut, Seaman's Hut, and Mawsons Hut. In recent year, many huts have been lost through lack of maintenance and bush fire, as occurred with the Pretty Plain Hut and Mount Franklin Chalet, which were destroyed by the Canberra bushfires of 2003.

Attractions
Australian Alps Walking Track is a long-distance walking trail through the alpine areas of Victoria, New South Wales, and the ACT.

New South Wales
Kosciuszko National Park
Snowy Mountains
Alpine Way
Barry Way
Snowy Mountains Highway
Snowy Mountains Scheme
Lake Eucumbene
Lake Jindabyne
Yarrangobilly Caves
Kiandra gold & skifields (where Skiing in Australia began in the 1860s).
Trout fishing in New South Wales
Skiing in New South Wales

Victoria
Alpine National Park
Avon Wilderness Park
Baw Baw National Park
Mount Buffalo National Park
Mount Feathertop
Mount Skene scenic reserve
Bogong High Plains
Great Alpine Road
National Alpine Museum
Lake Tali Karng
Skiing in Victoria

Australian Capital Territory
Namadgi National Park
Bimberi Nature Reserve
Tidbinbilla Nature Reserve
Tharwa Road
Corin Forest
Mount Franklin (Australian Capital Territory)
Skiing in the Australian Capital Territory

Resort skiing areas

The Australian Alps are the main region in which skiing in Australia takes place (although skiing is also possible in Tasmania). Skiable terrain stretches through large areas of territory from June to October. New South Wales is home to Australia's highest snow country, oldest ski fields, and largest resort. Recreational skiing in Australia began around 1861 at Kiandra, New South Wales, when Norwegian gold miners introduced the idea to the frozen hills around the town. The first and longest-surviving ski club in the world, the Kiandra Snow Shoe Club, is believed to have been formed at Kiandra in that year. Steeper slopes and more reliable snows lie further to the south, and in the 20th century, the focus of recreational skiing in New South Wales shifted southward, to mountains in and around the Kosciuszko Main Range region, where Australia's best vertical drop is found at Thredbo and Australia's biggest resort, Perisher is now found. The State of Victoria is the one with the largest number of skiing areas in Australia.

Mount Bogong, with its peak at 1986 m above sea level, is the highest peak in Victoria. The surrounding Bogong High Plains is one of the largest areas of snow country in Australia. It includes the leading resorts of Falls Creek and Mount Hotham. Recreational and practical skiing was being practised in the Victorian Alps by the 1880s and 1890s with skis made from local timbers, and making use of single steering poles. Skiing began at Mount Buffalo in the 1890s, and a chalet was constructed in 1910. Australia's first ski tow was constructed near Mount Buffalo in 1936.

Cross-country skiing is possible in the ACT, as well as in New South Wales and Victoria, but downhill skiing can only be done in New South Wales and Victoria:

New South Wales
Perisher
Perisher Valley
Guthega
Mount Blue Cow
Smiggin Holes
Thredbo
Charlotte Pass
Selwyn Snowfields

Victoria
Mount Buller
Falls Creek
Mount Hotham
Dinner Plain
Mount Baw Baw
Mount Buffalo
Lake Mountain (cross country)
Mount Stirling (cross country)
Mount St Gwinear (cross country)
Mount Donna Buang (snow play)

Panoramas

References

External links

 Australian Alps National Parks official website (archived 18 July 2008)
 

Great Dividing Range
Regions of New South Wales
Regions of Victoria (Australia)
IBRA regions
Biogeography of New South Wales
Biogeography of Victoria (Australia)
Important Bird Areas of New South Wales
Important Bird Areas of Victoria (Australia)